Cargo vessel Monte Penedo was the first German sea-going diesel-engined motor vessel. Seized by the Brazilian Government in 1917 and renamed Sabará, she operated various routes from Brazil. From 1948 until scrapping in 1969 she was named Ascanio Coelho.

History
Monte Penedo was launched two years after Dutch tanker Vulcanus and one year after Danish , both claimed to be the world's first ocean-going diesel ship.

Following a transatlantic crossing from Hamburg (non-stop from Lisbon to Paranaguá, Brazil), cracks were found in several pistons of Monte Penedos engines. As a precaution, all the pistons were replaced in Buenos Aires. During the subsequent thirty-day voyage from Rosario to Hamburg in February 1914, the engines worked without fault. On inspection, the engines showed no problems and no appreciable wear. Average fuel consumption was 7,200 kg per 24 hours. The International Marine Engineering magazine, Vol 18 (1913), has a report from Sulzer Brothers refuting rumours of an unsatisfactory engine.

From 1914 to 1917, the German-flagged vessel took shelter at Rio Grande do Sul, Brazil, to avoid capture by Allied forces. In 1917, she was seized by the Brazilian Government and renamed Sabará. From 1922, she was managed by Lloyd Brasileiro, and eventually purchased by them in 1927.

Sabará does not appear in any convoy records during World War II. During 1948, she was renamed Ascanio Coelho. She was broken up in Rio de Janeiro during December 1969.

Layout
Monte Penedo was initially fitted with two Sulzer 4S47 two-stroke crosshead diesel engines. These were replaced in 1949 with new Sulzer 7TS36 diesel engines.

Service
The Companhia de Navegação Lloyd Brasileiro (Patrimonio Nacional) operated routes from several Brazilian ports including:
 Montevideo, Buenos Aires, Corumbá, Lisbon, Vigo, Havre, Antwerp, Rotterdam, Hamburg;
 Santos, Rio de Janeiro, New York, Hampton Roads, Baltimore;
 Rio de Janeiro, New Orleans;
 Buenos Aires, Rio de Janeiro, Manaus

Footnotes

1912 ships
Ships built in Kiel
Cargo ships of Brazil
Cargo ships of Germany